

Films

References

LGBT
1994 in LGBT history
1994